PT Astra Daihatsu Motor (also called ADM) is an automobile manufacturing company based in Jakarta, Indonesia. It is a joint venture company between Daihatsu, Astra International and Toyota Tsusho. It is the largest car manufacturer in Indonesia by production output and installed capacity, and has been second best-selling car brand behind Toyota. ADM also supplied most Toyota-branded models sold in Indonesia, which includes compact cars such as Avanza, Rush, Agya and Calya.

The company was created as a result of a merger of three companies in 1992, which are PT Daihatsu Indonesia, PT Daihatsu Engine Manufacturing Indonesia, and PT National Astra Motor. Daihatsu increased its stake from 40 to 61.75% in 2002. Distribution, sales and after sales service of Daihatsu vehicles are handled by Daihatsu Sales Operation (AI-DSO), a division of Astra International.

History 
In 1973, Astra International gained the rights to import Daihatsu vehicles to Indonesia. Astra became the sole agent, importer and distributor of Daihatsu in the Indonesian market in 1976. In 1978, PT Daihatsu Indonesia was formed by Astra International, Daihatsu dan Nichimen Corporation as a steel pressing plant. An engine plant, PT Daihatsu Engine Manufacturing Indonesia (DEMI) was created in 1983. PT Nasional Astra Motor was formed in 1987 as the sole agent and importer of Daihatsu. In 1992, these three companies merged to form ADM.

In 2003, ADM along with partner Toyota Astra Motor unveiled the Toyota Avanza and Daihatsu Xenia. The vehicles are part of the first collaboration project of Toyota, Daihatsu, and Astra and combined Toyota's expertise in Toyota Production System (TPS) and Daihatsu's expertise in producing low-cost vehicles. At the time, production capacity of the ADM plant is capped at 80,000 vehicles annually. By 2005, it was expanded to 200,000. It further expanded to current 530,000 after a series of expansions and the opening of a new plant in Karawang.

Facilities 
ADM is supported by five plants, which are Sunter Assembly Plant, Sunter Press Plant, Karawang Casting Plant, Karawang Engine Plant and the Karawang Assembly Plant, supported by a spare parts center at Cibitung, with an overall installed production capacity of 530,000 units per year. ADM also operates a Research and Development (R&D) center facility in Karawang. The facility is equipped with a design studio, test courses for vehicle trials on more than simulated 20 types of road conditions, and an Engineering Center facility.

Models

Current models

Manufactured for Toyota
 Toyota Agya/Wigo (2012–present)
 Toyota Avanza (2003–present)
 Toyota Calya (2016–present)
 Toyota Raize (2021–present)
 Toyota Rush (2006–present)
 Toyota TownAce/LiteAce (2008–present, exports only)

Manufactured for Mazda
 Mazda Bongo (2020–present, exports only)

Former models

Manufactured locally
 Daihatsu Ceria (2001–2007)
 Daihatsu Charade (1977–1998)
 Daihatsu Classy (1990–1998)
 Daihatsu Delta (–1998)
 Daihatsu Feroza (1984–2002)
 Daihatsu Hijet (1977–1986)
 Daihatsu Hi-Max (2016–2019)
 Daihatsu Hiline (1986–2007)
 Daihatsu Rocky (1988–1997)
 Daihatsu Taft (1976–2007)
 Daihatsu Taruna (1999–2006)
 Daihatsu Zebra (1986–1995)
 Daihatsu Zebra Espass (1995–2007)

Imported
 Daihatsu Copen (2015–2018, imported from Japan)
 Daihatsu Hijet (1972–1977, imported from Japan)
 Daihatsu YRV (2001–2003, imported from Japan)

References

External links
 

Car manufacturers of Indonesia
Daihatsu
Manufacturing companies based in Jakarta
Vehicle manufacturing companies established in 1992
Indonesian companies established in 1992